The Men's Individual Pursuit was a cycling event at the 1984 Summer Olympics in Los Angeles, California over a distance of 4000m.

Medalists

Final results

Results

Qualifying round

Round 1

Quarter finals

Semi finals

Bronze medal race

Gold medal race

References

Cycling at the 1984 Summer Olympics
Cycling at the Summer Olympics – Men's individual pursuit
Track cycling at the 1984 Summer Olympics